Wuzhong may refer to:
Suzhou, Jiangsu, formerly known as Wuzhong
Wuzhong District, Suzhou, Jiangsu
Wuzhong, Ningxia, prefecture-level city in Ningxia
Wuzhong people to the north of China circa 700BC, said to be part of the Shanrong, who lived near Beijing, or Taiyuan, or north towards the State of Yan